Álvaro González Alcaraz (born 29 October 1974) is a Spanish football player, who plays in goal for the Spain national 5-a-side football team. He has won a pair bronze medals at the 2004 Summer Paralympics and the 2012 Summer Paralympics.

Personal 
González is from Málaga.

5-a-side football 
González is a member of CDC de Málaga, which competes in the Andalusian Cup.  As the team's goalkeeper, he has won event.

González won a bronze medal with the team at the 2004 Summer Paralympics. The 2006 World Cup for the Blind was held in Argentina.  He competed at the event as the goalkeeper for Spain.  The team made it to the bronze medal match. He was one of ten sportspeople from Málaga to compete at the 2008 Summer Paralympics. In July 2008, he participated in a ceremony hosted by the Mayor of Málaga at the townhall honouring all the Olympic and Paralympic competitors from the city. He competed at the 2012 Summer Paralympics.  He was in goal in the game against Argentina for the bronze medal. In 2012, a specialized pitch, the first of its kind in Spain, was built in his hometown. In July 2012, he participated in a ceremony hosted by the Mayor of Málaga at the townhall honouring all the Olympic and Paralympic competitors from the city. He was one of 11 sportspeople on the Spanish team from Málaga competing at the London Games. His team won a bronze medal following a penalty shootout in the bronze medal game against Argentina, with González in for the shootout. He was one of seven sportspeople from Málaga to get a 2013  scholarship from Fundación Andalucía Olímpica as part of the Plan Andalucía Olímpica.  It was worth €1,200. In February 2013, he received an award at the Gala of Sports Journalists of Andalusia.

Notes

References

External links
 
 

1974 births
Living people
Paralympic 5-a-side footballers of Spain
Paralympic football goalkeepers
5-a-side footballers at the 2004 Summer Paralympics
5-a-side footballers at the 2008 Summer Paralympics
5-a-side footballers at the 2012 Summer Paralympics
Medalists at the 2004 Summer Paralympics
Medalists at the 2012 Summer Paralympics
Paralympic medalists in football 5-a-side
Paralympic bronze medalists for Spain